Smodicinus is a genus of spiders in the family Thomisidae. It was first described in 1895 by Simon. , it contains only one African species, Smodicinus coroniger.

References

Thomisidae
Monotypic Araneomorphae genera
Spiders of Africa